Omotunde Tabiti (born September 20, 1989), better known as Andrew Tabiti, is an American professional boxer. He challenged once for the vacant IBF cruiserweight title in June 2019. As of February 2021, he is ranked as the world’s fifth best active cruiserweight by The Ring magazine.

Professional career 
Tabiti made his professional debut on July 19, 2013, stopping Andrew Howk in the first round. He trains out of the Mayweather Boxing Club in Las Vegas and is trained by Floyd Mayweather Sr., Jeff Mayweather and Otis Pimpleton.

Tabiti possesses extraordinary speed and reflexes along with his explosive punching-power, this is notably unusual for a fighter of his size.

He won the NABF cruiserweight title in May 2016 after decisioning Keith Tapia.

In February 2017, he retained the NABF cruiserweight title by stopping Quantis Graves via corner stoppage in Temecula, California.

He retained the NABF cruiserweight title and won the USBA cruiserweight title in August 2017.

2018-19 World Boxing Super Series

Tabiti vs. Fayfer
On October 13, 2018, Tabiti, ranked #3 by the IBF and #5 by the WBC, fought Ruslan Fayfer, ranked #2 by the IBF, #5 by the WBA, #10 by the WBO and #15 by the WBC as a part of the WBSS cruiserweight quarter-final. Tabiti won on all three scorecards, 114-113, 115-112 and 116-111 to advance to the WBSS semi-finals.

Tabiti vs. Dorticos
On June 15, 2019, Tabiti, ranked #1 by the IBF, #2 by the WBA and WBC and #6 by the WBO fought Yuniel Dorticos who was ranked #1 by the WBA and #3 by the WBC, IBF and WBO at cruiserweight in the semi-finals of the WBSS, with the vacant IBF cruiserweight title on the line. In the tenth round, Dorticos scored a vicious knockout over Tabiti, catching him with a perfectly placed right hand to end the bout immediately.

Professional boxing record

Personal life
Tabiti's parents are Nigerian.

References

External links
 

1989 births
Living people
American male boxers
American sportspeople of Nigerian descent
Boxers from Chicago
Cruiserweight boxers